Ragnhildur Rósa Guðmundsdóttir (born 20 July 1984) is an Icelandic former team handball player. She played on the Icelandic national team and participated at the 2011 World Women's Handball Championship in Brazil.

References

1984 births
Living people
Ragnhildur Rosa Gudmundsdottir
Ragnhildur Rosa Gudmundsdottir